Crambus watsonellus, or Watson's grass-veneer, is a moth in the family Crambidae. It was described by Alexander Barrett Klots in 1942. It is found in North America, where it has been recorded from Florida, Illinois, Maine, Michigan, Ohio, Oklahoma and Ontario. The habitat consists of marshy areas.

References

Crambini
Moths described in 1942
Moths of North America